Ghanool is a village and union council (an administrative subdivision) of Mansehra District in the Khyber-Pakhtunkhwa province of Pakistan. It is located in Balakot tehsil and lies in an area that was affected by the 2005 Kashmir earthquake. The union council of Ghanool has four village councils: Ghanool, Sangar-1, Sangar-2, and Bhangian. Sangar is the most populous area of Ghanool with the majority of the population belonging to the Madakhel tribe. Paya, which is also known as Sari and Paya, is a meadow at a height of more than 9000 feet. Makra Peak, a mountain 3885 meters above sea level is located in Ghanool.  Tribes living in Ghanool include Mughals Barlas, Rajputs, Awans, Swati, and Madakhels.

References
3- Photo By Khaliq zaman

Union councils of Mansehra District
Populated places in Mansehra District
2005 Kashmir earthquake